Philip Ferdinand (1555, Poland - 1598, Leiden) was an English Hebraist.

Born in Poland to Polish Jewish parents, he converted first to Roman Catholicism and then to Protestantism.  He was a poor student at Oxford University, where he taught Hebrew.  He matriculated at Cambridge University in 1596.  He became professor of Hebrew at Leiden, where he died.  He translated Rabbinic works into Latin.

References

1555 births
1598 deaths
16th-century Polish Jews
Academics of the University of Oxford
Academic staff of Leiden University
English translators
Polish emigrants to the Kingdom of England